Ptereleotris randalli, the Brazilian dartfish, is a fish belonging to the family Gobiidae and subfamily Ptereleotrinae. Like other dartfishes, it lives over sand and rubble bottoms, and quickly retreats into holes when approached. It was originally thought to be restricted to Brazil, south to Santa Catarina, but recently reported for the southern Caribbean, where it's found at depths of 8-60m.

References 

Fish described in 2001
Fish of Brazil
Taxa named by Luiz A. Rocha
Ptereleotris